Joseph Castiglioni (27 September 1877 – 7 June 1959) was a French gymnast. He competed at the 1900 Summer Olympics and the 1908 Summer Olympics.

References

External links

1877 births
1959 deaths
French male artistic gymnasts
Olympic gymnasts of France
Gymnasts at the 1900 Summer Olympics
Gymnasts at the 1908 Summer Olympics
Sportspeople from Oran
French people in French Algeria